Richard Batchden was an English medieval university chancellor.

Batchden was probably Chancellor of Oxford University between 1231 and 1233.

References

Year of birth unknown
Year of death unknown
English Roman Catholics
Chancellors of the University of Oxford
13th-century English people
13th-century Roman Catholics